Agyneta flibuscrocus is a species of sheet weaver found in the United States. It was described by Dupérré in 2013.

References

flibuscrocus
Spiders described in 2013
Spiders of the United States